Benjamin "Ben" Dunkelman (26 June 1913 – June 11, 1997) was a Canadian Jewish officer who served in the Canadian Army in World War II and the Israel Defense Forces in the 1948 Arab–Israeli War. In Israel, he was called Benjamin Ben-David.

Biography

Early life
Benjamin Dunkelman was the son of Ashkenazim immigrants from the town of Makov (modern Maków Mazowiecki, Poland) in the Russian Empire. His father was David Dunkelman, the founder of the Canadian men's retailers, Tip Top Tailors and his mother Rose was a committed Zionist. Dunkelman and his siblings grew up on an estate, Sunnybrook Farm (now the site of Sunnybrook Medical Centre), northeast of Toronto built by his wealthy father. Dunkelman later recalled about growing on Sunnybrooke Farm that "it was a dreamland, a children’s paradise".

He attended Upper Canada College in Toronto, where he was noted for his active social life and for excelling at football. Besides his love of sports, Dunkelman enjoyed sailing Lake Ontario in his yacht. In 1931, financial losses caused by the Great Depression forced David Dunkelman to sell off Sunnybrook Farm. 

At the age of 18, Dunkelman went off to work on a kibbutz in Palestine, at that time a League of Nations Mandate administered by Great Britain. Dunkelman was inspired by his Zionist mother to go to the Palestine Mandate. At the kibbutz, he worked as a shomer, an armed watchman, whose duty it was to protect the kibbutz from being attacked by Palestinian raiders. Dunkelman recalled: "I went off a flabby, pampered boy; I returned as a tough young man who had seen the world." He loved the Holy Land, and only reluctantly returned to Toronto. He returned to Toronto in 1932 to assist his father, but went again to Palestine in the late 1935 to develop new settlements.

Military career
He was back in Toronto in 1939 when the Second World War broke out. He attempted to join the Royal Canadian Navy (RCN), but anti-semitism in the RCN at the time precluded a naval career. Instead Dunkelman enlisted as a private with The Queen's Own Rifles of Canada; as the war progressed he rose from Private to Major. Dunkelman enlisted with the Second Battalion of the Queen's Own Rifles in 1940. Dunkelman later gave his reasons for enlisting as an "active" (willing to fight overseas) member as: "I am a Canadian, proud of Canada’s heritage and proud -- if need be -- to fight for it." 

He was in the second wave to land on Juno beach, the Canadian beach in the Normandy landings on D-Day 6 June 1944. During his career with the regiment he earned numerous commendations.  He also fought in the difficult campaigns in northern France, Belgium, the Netherlands and Germany, including bloody battles at Caen, Falaise, and the Battle of the Scheldt to open up the critical port of Antwerp. During the Normandy campaign in June-August 1944 and then during the Battle of the Scheldt, the Canadian Army took heavy losses. At the same time, the policy of Prime Minister William Lyon Mackenzie King of only sending "active" members who volunteered to fight overseas ensured there was a shortage of replacements for the losses as there were only a  limited number of men who had enlisted voluntarily. Under Mackenzie King's policy, men were conscripted for the military, but only for the defense of Canada, leading to a situation where two divisions stood waiting on the coast of British Columbia and another division on the coast of Nova Scotia. At the time of the Battle of the Scheldt, Dunkelman wrote in disgust: "We knew why leaves were so scarce. Thanks to Prime Minister Mackenzie King's handling of the Conscription issue at home".     

In 1945, he was awarded a Distinguished Service Order (DSO) for his service in the Hochwald campaign in northwest Germany during the drive to the river Rhine. In March 1945, Dunkelman played a key role in taking the steep Balberger Wald ridge in the dark forests of the Hochwald. 

After the war, he was offered command of the Queen's Own Rifles but declined owing to business interests at home. Dunkelman returned to Canada, but again decided to travel to war, this time to fight for Israel in the spring of 1948. On 14 May 1948, the Palestine Mandate came to an end and the State of Israel was proclaimed. Israel was immediately invaded by the armies of Egypt, Saudi Arabia, Jordan, Iraq, Syria and Lebanon who joined the two Palestinian armies who had been fighting the Jewish population since December 1947. He arrived there at a time when the Israeli army was short of officers with combat experience. Initially, he took command of a mortar unit in the Mahal, the legion of Jewish and Christian foreign volunteers fighting for Israel.

Dunkelman's skill with mortars brought him to the attention of the Israeli High Command, and he was instrumental in the breaking of the siege of Jerusalem, which had been besieged by the Jordanians almost since the beginning of the war. Shortly afterwards, he became the commander of the 7th Brigade, the country's best-known armored brigade. Dunkelman and the 7th Brigade were initially sent to Galilee to halt the advance of the Syrians. Under his command, the 7th Brigade stopped the Syrian advance and recaptured much of upper western Galilee. 

In his autobiography, called Dual Allegiance, Dunkelman tells the story of how, between July 8 and 18, 1948 during Operation Dekel, he led the 7th Brigade and its supporting units as it moved to capture the town of Nazareth. Nazareth surrendered after little more than token resistance. The Palestinians of Nazareth were overwhelmingly Christian. The Palestinian Christians of Nazareth had little interest in being incorporated into a Muslim state, whether under the leadership of King Abdullah I of Jordan, who wanted Palestine for himself, or of Muhammad Amin al-Husayni, the Grand Mufti of Jerusalem and would-be future Palestinian leader, who was supported by King Farouk of Egypt and King Ibn Saud of Saudi Arabia. The surrender was formalized in a written agreement, where the town leaders accepted to cease hostilities in return for solemn promises from the Israeli officers, including Dunkelman, that no harm would come to the Palestinian civilians of the town.

Shortly after the capture, Dunkelman received orders from General Chaim Laskov to expel the Palestinian civilian population from the town, which he refused to carry out. Israeli journalist and translator Peretz Kidron, with whom Dunkelman collaborated in writing Dual Allegiance, reproduced his record of Dunkelman's account of the capture of Nazareth in a book chapter entitled "Truth Whereby Nations Live":
"[less than a day later] Haim Laskov [came] to me with astounding orders: Nazareth's civilian population was to be evacuated! I was shocked and horrified. I told him I would do nothing of the sort—in view of our promises to safeguard the city's people, such a move would be both superfluous and harmful. I reminded him that scarcely a day earlier, he and I, as representatives of the Israeli army, had signed the surrender document in which we solemnly pledged to do nothing to harm the city or its population. When Haim saw that I refused to obey the order, he left."

12 hours after Dunkelman had refused to expel the inhabitants of Nazareth, Laskov had appointed another officer as military governor.
"Two days after the second truce came into effect, the Seventh Brigade was ordered to withdraw from Nazareth. Avraham Yaffe, who had commanded the 13th battalion in the assault on the city, now reported to me with orders from Moshe Carmel to take over from me as its military governor. I complied with the order, but only after Avraham had given me his word of honour that he would do nothing to harm or displace the Arab population. [....] I felt sure that [the order to withdraw from Nazareth] had been given because of my defiance of the evacuation order."

Dunkelman's defiance of the evacuation order forced Laskov to attempt to obtain sanction from a higher level. However, David Ben-Gurion finally vetoed the order; the Arab inhabitants in Nazareth were never forced to evacuate. Dunkelman's argument that expelling the mostly Christian Palestinians of Nazareth would damage relations with the overwhelming Christian nations of the West seemed to have changed Ben-Gurion's mind. During the war, Dunkelman met and married Yael Lifshitz. Lifshitz was a corporal in the Israeli Army who served under Dunkelman.

Civilian career
After the war Dunkelman was offered, but refused, a commission in the peacetime Israeli Army; the Dunkelmans returned instead to Toronto where he went into the family business, which he expanded then sold to Dylex Limited in 1967. In recognition of Dunkelman's World War II service, the Parliament of Canada voted to give Yael Dunkelman Canadian citizenship, instead of forcing her to apply for Canadian citizenship, which her husband called a "splendid gesture". The Dunkelmans were to have six children.

He later became a developer. Among his developments were the Cloverdale Mall and the Constellation Hotel, later renamed the Regal Constellation Hotel. Dunkelman was one of the founders of the Island Yacht Club , which he founded in 1951 after the Royal Canadian Yacht Club refused to accept him on account of his being Jewish. Dunkelman lived in retirement in Toronto until his death. 

In 1967, he almost died of a heart attack, which led him to retire from the family's business of running the Tip Top Tailor company. After his heart attack, he decided to focus on his real passion, collecting art. He and his wife also ran the Dunkelman Gallery in Toronto as well as several restaurants. The Dunkelman Gallery, which he founded in 1967, became "well-known as a showcase for Canadian and international artists". In September 1969, the Dunkelman Gallery hosted the personal archaeological collection of the Israeli Defense Minister, General Moshe Dayan, which mostly consisted of art from ancient Canaan and Phoenicia.

There is a bridge on the Lebanese border called Gesher Ben in Dunkelman's honor. His story is told in the film Ben Dunkelman: The Reluctant Warrior.

References 

1913 births
1997 deaths
Israeli military personnel
Canadian Army personnel of World War II
Upper Canada College alumni
Canadian Jews
Canadian people of Polish-Jewish descent
Nazareth
Israeli people of the 1948 Arab–Israeli War
Jewish military personnel
Queen's Own Rifles of Canada soldiers
Canadian Companions of the Distinguished Service Order
Queen's Own Rifles of Canada officers
Military personnel from Toronto